The District Council of Rocky River was a local government area in South Australia from 1988 to 1997, seated at Gladstone.

History
The council came into existence on 1 May 1988 with the amalgamation of the District Council of Georgetown, District Council of Gladstone and District Council of Laura. It had nine members divided amongst three wards (Georgetown, Gladstone and Laura), each returning three councillors. It was relatively short-lived, as on 3 May 1997 it merged with the District Council of Jamestown and the District Council of Spalding to create the Northern Areas Council. Its principal office was located in Gladstone.

See also
 Rocky River (South Australia)

References

Rocky River